Amin Golestan (Born as Amin Golestan Parast, 5 June 1988 in Dubai, UAE) is a New York based DJ, record label owner, and music producer. He was voted the number one DJ in 2008 and 2009 in the Middle East and Asia, and was the featured artist on the 2010 DJ Magazine Middle East cover. Golestan also runs the label Relocate Records.

Biography
Amin Golestan was born in Dubai after his family left Iran during the revolution. He grew up surrounded by international DJs on the Dubai music scene. After apprenticing for some of the world's preeminent talent, Amin began to DJ in Dubai.

Singles
 2009 Amin Golestan, Marco G – Dagobert
 2009 Amin Golestan, Xaver – Let's Do It Again
 2010 Amin Golestan, Marco G – Sanctuary
 2010 Amin Golestan, Marco G – Deadpool
 2012 Nima Nesta featuring Mednas – Derby

Remixes
 2008 Terrabyte – Quadrophonia
 2008 Steven Lee, Gaby Dershin – Flycatcher
 2008 Funkagenda, Paul Thomas – Thrapp
 2009 Muzikjunki – The Seashore
 2009 Dave Seaman – Gobbledygook
 2009 My Digital Enemy – Sunrise
 2009 Starkillers, Austin Leeds – All The Way
 2009 Austin Leeds, Steve Bertrand – Staring at the Sun

References

External links
 
 
 

1988 births
Living people
American DJs
American record producers
People from Dubai
Emirati expatriates in the United States